is a 1993 Japanese film directed by Yoichi Sai and starring Gorō Kishitani and Ruby Moreno.

Plot
Tadao (Goro Kishitani) is a North Korean immigrant who works in a taxi cab corporation wholly owned by another Korean immigrant whose dream is to build a golf course. He suffers from chronic discrimination.

Tadao's mother owns a karaoke bar. Connie (Ruby Moreno), a Filipino immigrant, is the newly hired bartender who can fluently speak Japanese. Tadao pursues the homesick Connie to his mother's dismay.

Cast
 Goro Kishitani - Tadao
 Ruby Moreno - Connie
 Moeko Ezawa - Eijun, Tadao's mother
 Masato Furuoya - Konno
 Yoshiki Arizono - Hoso
 Kenichi Endo
 Masato Hagiwara - Businessman
 Akio Kaneda
 Kumija Kim
 Kim Soo-Jin
 Tatsuya Kimura
 Jun Kunimura - Tada
 Akaji Maro - Senba
 Shigemitsu Ogi
 Wishing Chong - Osamu Ono

Awards and nominations
18th Hochi Film Award 
Won: Best Film
Won: Best Director - Yōichi Sai
Won: Best Actress - Ruby Moreno
17th Japan Academy Prize
Nominated: Best Film
Nominated: Best Director - Yōichi Sai
Nominated: Best Screenplay
Nominated: Best Actress - Ruby Moreno
15th Yokohama Film Festival 
Won: Best Film
Won: Best Director - Yōichi Sai
Won: Best Cinematography - Junichi Fujisawa
Won: Best Supporting Actor - Masato Hagiwara
Won: Best Supporting Actress - Ruby Moreno

References

External links

1993 films
Films directed by Yōichi Sai
Japanese comedy films
Japanese drama films
Best Film Kinema Junpo Award winners
Films about interracial romance
Films about racism
Films about taxis
1990s Japanese films
1990s Japanese-language films